Harmiella is a monotypic genus of South American dwarf sheet spiders containing the single species, Harmiella schiapelliae. It was first described by Paolo Brignoli in 1979, and has only been found in Brazil. The genus is named in honour of German arachnologist Marie Harm.

References

Hahniidae
Monotypic Araneomorphae genera
Spiders of Brazil
Taxa named by Paolo Brignoli